SKB or skb may refer to:

Organisations
 Sayuz na Komunistite v Balgariya, (Union of Communists in Bulgaria)
 Skybus Airlines (ICAO code), US
 Streitkräftebasis, a German military logistics branch
 Svensk Kärnbränslehantering Aktiebolag, the Swedish Nuclear Fuel and Waste Management Company

Other uses
 Robert L. Bradshaw International Airport (IATA code), St. Kitts
 S-K-B, US country music group
 S. K. Balakrishnan (1935–2001), former mayor of Madurai, Tamil Nadu, India
 Swedish Polled (Svensk Kullig Boskap), a breed of cattle
 Toyota SKB, a truck
 .skb, a SketchUp file format; See Comparison of graphics file formats

See also
 SKB-Bank Arena, a stadium in Russia